The Unpleasant Profession of Jonathan Hoag is a collection of science fantasy short stories by American writer Robert A. Heinlein. Published by The Gnome Press in (1959), the collection was also published in paperback under the title 6 X H.

Contents
 "The Unpleasant Profession of Jonathan Hoag" (1942)
 "The Man Who Traveled in Elephants" (1957)
 "—All You Zombies—" (1959)
 "They" (1941)
 "Our Fair City" (1948)
 "'—And He Built a Crooked House—'" (1941)

The stories in this collection were also published in The Fantasies of Robert A. Heinlein (1999).

Reception
Rating it 4.5 stars out of five, Galaxy reviewer Floyd C. Gale described the volume as "a delightful book."

Citations

General sources

External links
 

1959 short story collections
Gnome Press books
Short story collections by Robert A. Heinlein